Wisdom Tsidore Seyena-Susu (born 21 September 1938) is a Ghanaian politician and an architect. He served as a member of parliament for Ketu South constituency in the Volta Region of Ghana.

Early life and education 
Seyena-Susu was born on September 21, 1938, he attended Kwame Nkrumah University of Science and Technology and obtained a Bachelor of Science in architecture.

Career 
Seyena-Susu is a former member of the first parliament of the fourth republic of Ghana from January 1993 to January 1997. He is an Architect.

Politics 
Wisdom Tsidore Seyena-Susu was first elected during the 1992 Ghanaian parliamentary election on the ticket of the National Democratic Congress as first parliament of the fourth republic of Ghana. He lost the seat in 1996 Ghanaian general election to Charles Kofi Agbenaza of the National Democratic Congress who won with 53,276 votes which represented 68.90% of the share. He defeated Peter Kwesi Desky Ahedor of Convention People's Party (CPP) who obtained 3,609 votes which represented 4.70% of the share; Thomas Kwashikpmi Seshie of the New Patriotic Party (NPP) who obtained 2,150 votes which represented 2.80% of the share and Christian Yao Zigah of People's National Convention (PNC) who obtained 1,035 votes which represented 1.30% of the share.

Personal life 
He is a Christian.

References 

1938 births
Living people
Ghanaian architects
Ghanaian MPs 1993–1997
National Democratic Congress (Ghana) politicians
People from Volta Region
Ghanaian Christians
Kwame Nkrumah University of Science and Technology alumni